Dominik Takáč (born 12 January 1999) is a Slovak footballer who plays for Spartak Trnava as a goalkeeper.

Club career

Spartak Trnava 
Takáč made his professional Fortuna Liga debut for Spartak Trnava against AS Trenčín on 24 May 2019.

International career 
Takáč was first time called up to the Slovak national team nomination on 23 May 2022 by Štefan Tarkovič, while named with Marek Rodák and František Plach for four 2022–23 UEFA Nations League C fixtures against Belarus, Azerbaijan and twice against Kazakhstan. Tarkovič commented on this nomination saying that Takáč's nomination is a way of transferring quality from the domestic league to the national team. Takáč remained in the nomination in Francesco Calzona premier call-up for the national team in September. He remained uncapped in both call-ups. He was left out of the squad for November friendlies. In early December, senior national team prospective players' training camp was hosted at NTC Senec and Takáč was one of four nominated goalkeepers.

Honours 
Spartak Trnava
Slovak Cup: 2021–22

References

External links 
 FC Spartak Trnava official club profile
 Futbalnet profile 
 
 

1999 births
Living people
People from Galanta
Sportspeople from the Trnava Region
Slovak footballers
Slovakia youth international footballers
Association football goalkeepers
FC Spartak Trnava players
Slovak Super Liga players